Nowela Elizabeth Mikhelia Auparay (born 19 December 1987) is an Indonesian singer and winner of the eighth season of Indonesian Idol.

Career
Nowela was born in Wamena, Papua. Her father is of Papuan descent and her mother is Batak descent. After graduating from high school, she worked as a café singer for six years before participating in the eighth season of Indonesian Idol.

Performances and results

References

External links
  Profile at official website Indonesian Idol
 

21st-century Indonesian women singers
Indonesian Idol winners
1987 births
People from Wamena
Indonesian Christians
People of Batak descent
Living people